Maurice Genevoix (29 November 1890 – 8 September 1980) was a French author.

Life
Born on 29 November 1890 at Decize, Nièvre as Maurice-Charles-Louis-Genevoix, Genevoix spent his childhood in Châteauneuf-sur-Loire. After attending the local school, he studied at the lycée of Orléans and the Lycée Lakanal. Genevoix was accepted to the Ecole Normale Supérieure, being first in his class, but was soon mobilized into World War I in 1914. He was quickly promoted to a lieutenant. He participated in the bloody battles of the Les Éparges hill as well as along the road of Tranchée de Calonne to the south east of Verdun-sur-Meuse in late 1914 and early 1915. On the 25 April 1915 he was severely wounded in action in his left arm and side in the Tranchée de Calonne sector and returned to Paris. The battle in the Meuse in which he participated, especially those at Les Éparges left a profound influence on him, and he wrote the tetralogy Ceux de 14 (The Men of 1914), which brought him recognition among the public.

Around 1919, Genevoix contracted Spanish influenza, causing him to move back to the Loire. He was quite prolific during his time in the Loire area, earning a Prix Blumenthal grant from the Florence Blumenthal Foundation to support him as a professional writer. It was this grant that allowed him to continue with some of his most celebrated works, Rémi des Rauches and Raboliot, the latter of which earned him the Prix Goncourt.

In 1928, his father died, and Genevoix moved to Vernelles in Loiret. At around this time, Genevoix started to travel abroad to Canada, Scandinavia, Mexico, and Africa. Canada and Africa were both admired by the writer, the latter of which he dedicated a 1949 essay to it, Afrique blanche, Afrique noire. He was elected to the Académie française on 24 October 1946 and was formally inducted the following year. In 1950, he returned to Paris and became secretary of the Académie française in 1958. In 1970, Genevoix, who was president of the program committee of French state radio, started a television series on French writers. He was also offered the Grand prix national des Lettres. He died on 8 September 1980 and was buried in Passy Cemetery.

Genevoix presided over the Friends of the Natural History Museum Paris society for ten years from 1970 to 1980. The Académie française literary Prix Maurice Genevoix is named for him.

On 11 November 2020, Genevoix' remains were transferred to the Panthéon.

See also 
 Vaincre à Olympie
 Verdun Memorial

References

External links
 
 
His books
Biography

1890 births
1980 deaths
People from Nièvre
20th-century French writers
Writers from Bourgogne-Franche-Comté
French male writers
20th-century male writers
Lycée Lakanal alumni
École Normale Supérieure alumni
Members of the Académie Française
French military personnel of World War I
Prix Goncourt winners
Prix Blumenthal
Burials at Passy Cemetery
20th-century French male writers